The 1945 Utah Redskins football team was an American football team that represented the University of Utah as a member of the Mountain States Conference (MSC) during the 1945 college football season. In their 21st season under head coach Ike Armstrong, the Redskins compiled an overall record of 4–4 with a mark of 3–2 against conference opponents, placing third in the MSC.

Schedule

After the season

NFL Draft
Utah had five players selected in the 1946 NFL Draft.

References

Utah
Utah Utes football seasons
Utah Redskins football